Sounds Like... is a 1967 album by the instrumental group Herb Alpert & the Tijuana Brass, the group's eighth.

Background
According to liner notes in the 2006 Shout!Factory CD release, the title theme for the 1967 James Bond spoof Casino Royale was originally recorded with vocals, but Bacharach was dissatisfied with the recording. He sent the tapes to Herb Alpert, who overdubbed some trumpets and some Tijuana Brass instruments (most prominently marimba and percussion) and sent the song back to Bacharach. This version, with the Bacharach orchestra, rather than the Brass members, providing most of the backing, is the one included on the Sounds Like... album.

The song "Wade in the Water" was also a popular concert number, according to Alpert, and was featured in the group's first television special in 1967.

Critical reception

In a retrospective review for Allmusic, music critic Richard S. Ginell wrote the album was "fresh and musical and downright joyous" and summarized it was "an artifact of '60s pop culture, to be sure, but still a perfectly structured record."

Track listing

Side 1
 "Gotta Lotta Livin' to Do" (Lee Adams, Charles Strouse) - 2:47
 "Lady Godiva"  (Charlie Mills, Mike Leander) - 2:06
 "Bo-Bo" (Sol Lake) - 3:04
 "Shades of Blue" (Julius Wechter) - 2:44
 "In a Little Spanish Town" (Mabel Wayne, Joe Young, Sam M. Lewis) - 1:54
 "Wade in the Water" (Traditional, arranged by John Pisano, Edmondson and Alpert) - 3:03

Side 2
 "Town Without Pity" (Dimitri Tiomkin, Ned Washington) - 2:14
 "The Charmer" (John Pisano) - 2:13
 "Treasure of San Miguel" (Roger Nichols) - 2:14
 "Miss Frenchy Brown" (Ervan Coleman) - 2:27
 "Casino Royale" (Hal David, Burt Bacharach) - 2:35

Chart positions

References 

1967 albums
Herb Alpert albums
Albums produced by Herb Alpert
Albums produced by Jerry Moss
Albums recorded at Gold Star Studios
A&M Records albums